François Martin (1634– octobre 1706) was the first Governor General of Pondicherry. In 1673, Sher Khan Lodi, the governor of Valokondapuranam under the sultan of Bijapur granted sieur Bellanger de l'Espinay a site for a settlement. A shrewd and able administrator, François Martin, former director of the Masulipatnam lodge, developed Pondicherry, the future capital of French India in 1674 into a thriving port. 
He is known as the Father of Puducherry. 

The town was taken and sacked by the Dutch in 1693. François Martin, his family and followers, including Father Tachard, were taken captives to Batavia. Martin eventually negotiated his return to Chandernagor.

He was Commissioner of French East India Company before holding this post and was preceded by François Baron and succeeded by Pierre Dulivier. His Mémoires provide an accurate account of early French settlements in India. There is a street named after François Martin in Pondicherry.

References

Titles

French colonial governors and administrators
Governors of French India
1634 births
1706 deaths